Maalouf (alternative spellings: Maloof, Malouf, Malouff, Maluf, Malluf; Arabic: معلوف
المعلوف) is an Arabic surname.

Origins
The Maalouf family belongs to the group of tribes known as Ghassanids that emigrated from Yemen to Houran in modern Syria prior to the collapse of the Marib Dam around 102 AD The clan governed Houran and large surrounding regions for nearly 500 years until the Islamic conquest in 637 AD.

After the arrival of Islam, some members converted to Islam while most remained  Christian mainly Antiochian Eastern-Orthodox and Melkite Greek Catholic. Several prominent leaders are said to have received the special appellation of Maayuf meaning “exempted” or “protected.” When the ruling government subsequently rescinded this appellation, many clan members retained it in the form of a surname Maalouf, or Al-Maalouf. However, that version of the origin of the family name is disputed.

Ibrahim Maalouf nicknamed "Abi Rajih" reflecting his wisdom was a prominent and rich landowner in the town or village of Upper Damia in Houran. He had seven sons: Issa, Medlej, Farah, Hanna, Nasser, Nehme, and Semaan. For political, social and religious reasons, and as a result of a conflict that his family engaged in with neighboring clans in 1519 AD, Ibrahim decided to sell his land and leave Houran for the mountains of Lebanon, an area that became known for its rule of law under the Ottoman Empire.

The family crossed ash-Shām and the plains of Damascus, over the Anti-Lebanon mountain range, and at first settled for a few years in the village of Seriin to the northwest of the town of Zahlé in the Bekaa Valley. However, this stay was short lived due to conflicts with existing residents. In 1526 AD, Ibrahim decided to move from the Bekaa Valley to Bsharri in the high mountains of northern Lebanon. The route to Bsharri was difficult, and when the family stumbled onto an abandoned mountain village, they decided to resettle it. After rebuilding the structures, the village was named Douma in commemoration of the original Maalouf village in Houran. A church named for Saint Sarkis, venerated by the Christians of Houran, was also built in the village.

The stay in Douma was pleasant as the clan developed friendly relations with their neighbors and the ruling emir. However the murder of a ruler of Tripoli over his desire to marry one of the Maalouf daughters forced them to depart to the safety of Keserwan District that was ruled by an emir friendly to the family.

Upon arrival at Antelias, the clan decided that the families of Issa, Medlej, Farah and Hanna would settle in the high mountains of the Keserwan District, while the families of Nasser and Nehme would head to Vayelet Damasc, while the family of Semaan would stay on the coast near Antelias. The families of Issa, Medlej and Farah retained the surname of Maalouf, whereas the other branches adopted other surnames, notably Klink for the Hanna branch, Kreidy for the Semaan branch, Laham for the Nasser branch, and Najjar for the Nehme branch.

The first four branches settled in the village of Mhaydse in 1550 AD and lived peacefully for several years. From their homes, they observed across a deep ravine an attractive, protected and forested ridge which they often used as a hunting ground. After receiving permission from the ruling emir, the families of Issa, Medlej and Farah relocated their homes and built the village of Kfarakab in 1560 AD and the main church in 1570 AD The family of Hanna remained in Mhaidsse.

Kfarakab become the core settlement of the Maalouf clan and gave the family the opportunity to play an integral role in the social, economical, political and military developments in Lebanon. From Kfarakab, thousands of descendants migrated across Lebanon, and later, internationally, especially since the late 1800s, settling in the United States of America, Canada, Brazil, Mexico, Argentina, and Australia. The Maalouf family is now prominent in several Lebanese towns and villages, most notably Zahlé where an entire neighborhood is named after the family, Niha, and Chlifa, in the Beqaa Valley.

The Maalouf family's rich history is marked by a dedication to culture and education. The family contributed to Al-Nahda. Its descendants had to continue and excel in the arts and sciences. Family members include politicians, judges, lawyers, doctors, engineers, musicians, poets, historians, journalists, military officers, public servants, and ecclesiastics. Fourteen generations separate today's generation from their ancestor Ibrahim Abi Rajih.

Nasif 
Following their arrival at Ellis island in the early 20th century, a family of Maloofs had changed their names to Nasif and settled around the northeastern United States, many of whom live in Boston.

Notable persons

Maalouf
Amin Maalouf (born 1949), Lebanese-born French author and member of the Académie francaise
Edgar Maalouf (1934–2018), Lebanese politician
Edward Maalouf (born 1968), Lebanese competitive hand-cyclist, and the only person to have won medals for Lebanon at the Paralympic Games
Fady Maalouf (born 1979), Lebanese-German pop singer
Ibrahim Maalouf (born 1980), trumpeter, composer, arranger, and trumpet instructor
Jhony Maalouf, contestant in season 1 of the French The Voice: La Plus Belle Voix
Maria Maalouf, Lebanese journalist and political analyst
Melhem B. Maalouf  (1937–1996), President of the criminal chamber at the Lebanese Court of Cassation.
Nasri Maalouf (1911–2005), Lebanese politician, Member of Parliament, minister
Nassim Maalouf (born 1941), Lebanese classical trumpet soloist who adapted the trumpet to Arabic music
Samir Maalouf, Lebanese actor
Toni Maalouf, Lebanese actor
Habib Maalouf, Lebanese journalist, writer, advisor of the Ministry of Environment, Lebanon

Malouf
David Malouf (born 1934), Australian writer
Jacqui Malouf (born 1968), Canadian television host, cook, and author
Joseph Malouf (1893–1968), the Melkite Greek Catholic Archbishop of Baalbek, Lebanon
Michael Malouf, Australian businessman, former chief executive officer of the Carlton Football Club
Dominic Malouf, (born 1992), Australian investment banker, currently based in Paris, France

Maloof
Adrienne Maloof (born 1961), American businesswoman and television personality
George J. Maloof Jr. (born 1964), American real estate businessman
George J. Maloof Sr. (1923–1980), American businessman and, at the time of his death, owner of the Houston Rockets
Jack Maloof (born 1949), former minor league baseball player
Manuel Maloof (1924–2004), American businessman and politician
Richard Maloof (born 1940), American musician who played bass and tuba for the Lawrence Welk orchestra
Sam Maloof (born Samuel Solomon Maloof) (1916–2009), American furniture designer and woodworker

Nasif
Ronald Nasif (born 1952), orthopedic surgeon and former football coach who created the Brookline Pop Warner football league
Christopher Nasif (born 1987), American real estate businessman, investor and engineer
Gregory Nasif (born 1989), political director and spokesperson for Humanity Forward

See also
Disambiguation pages
Maloof (disambiguation)
Malouf (disambiguation)
Maluf (disambiguation)
Others
Maloof family
Maloof Money Cup
Maloof Productions
Malouf syndrome

References

External links
Maloofs International website
Maloof Foundation website

Surnames
Arabic-language surnames
Christian families
Lebanese families